María Mercedes Pérez Merino (born 18 November 1960) is a Spanish trade unionist and politician from Podemos. In 2021, she joined the Cortes Generales, replacing Pablo Iglesias Turrión.

References 

Living people
1960 births
Spanish trade unionists
Members of the 13th Congress of Deputies (Spain)
Members of the 14th Congress of Deputies (Spain)
Podemos (Spanish political party) politicians
Women members of the Congress of Deputies (Spain)
21st-century Spanish politicians
21st-century Spanish women politicians